The Turkish Aviation Command and Turkish Army Aviation Command , was established in 1948 under the name of "artillery crafting" within the Turkish Land Forces artillery school. It is the administrative center of the Turkish Land Aviation School in Isparta, which trains officers and petty officers to the Turkish army. The airbase has played an important role in the Cyprus Operation.

History 
Since 1968, the rotary wing aircraft taken from the Turkish Air Force inventory joined the union. Its mission is to provide air support to Turkish land troops and to support the battle by making transport reconnaissance.

In the coup attempt on July 15, 2016, a group of soldiers attempted a coup attempt under the leadership of Ünsal Coşkun, who served as Commander of the Army Aviation School at the rank of brigadier general. Former brigadier Coşkun declared himself the Commander of the Aviation and managed some helicopters used in the coup until he went to Akıncı Air Base.

Formations

Affiliated units
1st Land Aviation Regiment (Güvercinlik Army Air Base)
2nd Land Aviation Regiment (Erhaç Airport, Malatya)
3rd Land Aviation Regiment (Gaziemir Air Base, İzmir)
4th Land Aviation Regiment (Samandıra Air Base, Istanbul)
7. Land Air Group Command (Diyarbakır Air Base)

Vehicles

Unmanned aerial vehicles

Commanders
Maj.Gen. Salih Ulusoy (2008-2012)
Maj.Gen. Hamza Koçyiğit (2012-2015)
Maj.Gen. Hakan Atınç (2015-2016)
İdris Feyzi Okan (2016-2017) (was exported, see also: 2016 Turkish coup d'état attempt)
Brig. Osman Dirmencioğlu (2017-2019)

See also
Turkish Land Aviation School (Isparta, Turkey)

References

External links
Command webcite

Turkish Army Aviation Command
Army aviation units and formations of Turkey
Turkish Army Aviation Command
Military units and formations established in 1957
1957 establishments in Turkey